Fāṭima bint Aḥmad Muḥammad al-Jahḍamī, known as Fāṭima al-Suqutriyya (Fatima the Socotran) and nicknamed al-Zahra on the model of the Prophet's daughter Fāṭima, for whom al-Zahra ('the shining one') was a popular epithet, was a Yemeni writer and poet who lived on the island of Socotra in the third century AH (816–913 CE). She is thought to be the first known Socotran poet.

Biography 
Little is actually known about al-Suqutriyya. She is thought to have been born on the island of Socotra, during the third century AH. She was a poet and was related to Sultan al-Qāsim bin Muḥammad al-Jahḍamī, the ruler of the Yemeni island of Socotra. He was killed by Ethiopians who attacked the island. Al-Suqutriyya reputedly wrote a qasida to Imam al-Ṣalt ibn Mа̄lik, who had assumed the imamate of Oman in 273 AH / 886 CE, requesting help from him. The poem was sent by sea and found by a fisherman who passed it on to the imam. The Imam sent a fleet of one hundred boats to Socotra, defeating the Ethiopian force on Socotra.

Al-Suqutriyya died some time after the year 273 AH / 886 CE.

Work
Al-Suqutriyya is known for the long poem attributed to her, addressed to al-Ṣalt ibn Mа̄lik. The opening of the poem runs

Reception 
Al-Suqutriyya is considered a lost voice in Omani literature, whose work was re-discovered in the twentieth century. In the assessment of Serge D. Elie, her poem
seems to be the first act of writing—or more aptly, discursive insurrection—attributed to a Soqotran, and as such it is the source of pride among Soqotrans. However, as this poem became part of popular ‘historiology’—that peculiar combination of orality and literacy, resulting into a synthesis of fact and fiction—the incident was believed to have taken place during the time of the Portuguese, and through a process of osmosis (as literacy remains a problem) has permeated the culture and shaped collective memory.

Al-Suqutriyya's story and her poetry featured in an episode of "History and Heritage (Omani Personalities Immortalized by History)" presented by Dr. Hamid Al-Nawfali for Al-Ru'ya TV. This programme became controversial when it was aired in Socotra, because it claimed that Al-Suqutriyya was from Oman. A resident of the island, Abdul Karim Qabalan, called on the television company to apologise. In 2016, the novelist Munir Talal published a retelling of the poem.

Notes

References

External links 
 Of Oman's Poets: Al-Zahra Al-Soqatriya - Fatima bint Hamad bin Khalfan Al-Jahhamiya by Dr. Muhammad Al-Harthi

Medieval women poets
Arabic-language women poets
Arabic-language poets
9th-century deaths
9th-century women writers
9th-century Arabic poets
Socotra
9th-century Arabs
Arab women